The Taiwanese ambassador in the Aiwo District is the official representative of the Government in Taipei to the Government of Nauru. There was a representative of the Government in Beijing to the Government of Nauru between 2002 and 2005.

List of representatives

References 

Nauru
Nauru
China
Ambassadors of the Republic of China to Nauru